Cyril Lucaris or Loukaris (13 November 1572 – 27 June 1638), born Constantine Lucaris, was a Greek prelate and theologian, and a native of Candia, Crete (then under the Republic of Venice). He later became the Greek Patriarch of Alexandria as Cyril III and Ecumenical Patriarch of Constantinople as Cyril I. He has been said to have attempted a reform of the Eastern Orthodox Church along Calvinist Protestant lines. Attempts to bring Calvinism into the Orthodox Church were rejected, and Cyril's actions, motivations, and specific viewpoints remain a matter of debate among scholars. However, the Orthodox Church recognizes him as a hieromartyr and defender of the Orthodox faith against both the Jesuit Catholics and Calvinist Protestants. The official glorification of Cyril Loukaris took place by decision of the Holy Synod of the Patriarchate of Alexandria on 6 October 2009, and his memory is commemorated on 27 June.

Life
Cyril Lucaris was born in Candia (Heraklion), Kingdom of Candia on 13 November 1572, when the island was part of the Venetian Republic's maritime empire.  In his youth he travelled through Europe, studying at Venice and the University of Padua, and at Geneva where he came under the influence of Calvinism and the Reformed faith. Lucaris pursued theological studies in Venice and Padua, Wittenberg and Geneva where he developed greater antipathy for Roman Catholicism. Probably, during that time he was the Rector of Ostroh Academy.

While the exact date is unknown, Lucaris was ordained in Constantinople. In 1596 Lucaris was sent to the Polish–Lithuanian Commonwealth by Meletius Pegas, Patriarch of Alexandria, to lead the Orthodox opposition to the Union of Brest-Litovsk, which proposed a union of Kiev with Rome. For six years Lucaris served as professor of the Orthodox academy in Vilnius (now in Lithuania). In 1601, Lucaris was installed as the Patriarch of Alexandria at the age of twenty-nine.  He would continue to hold this office for twenty years, until his elevation to the See of Constantinople. During these years, Lucaris adopted a theology which was heavily influenced by Protestant Reformation doctrine. On 6 September, he wrote a letter to Mark Antonio de Dominis, a former Roman Catholic Archbishop, writing:

Due to Turkish oppression combined with the proselytization of the Orthodox faithful by Jesuit missionaries, there was a shortage of schools which taught the Orthodox Faith and the Greek language.  Roman Catholic schools were set up and Catholic churches were built next to Orthodox ones, and since Orthodox priests were in short supply something had to be done. His first act was to found a theological seminary in Mount Athos, the Athoniada school.

In 1627, he authorized the establishment of a Greek language printing press in Istanbul, the first of its kind.  However, the French government lodged an official protest with Ottoman authorities once the press began to publish anti-Catholic polemics, and as a result, Ottoman authorities ordered its closure one year later.

He sponsored Maximos of Gallipoli to produce the first translation of the New Testament in Modern Greek.

Calvinism
Cyril's aim was to reform the Eastern Orthodox Church along Calvinistic lines, and to this end he sent many young Greek theologians to the universities of Switzerland, the northern Netherlands and England. In 1629 he published his famous Confessio (Calvinistic doctrine), but as far as possible accommodated to the language and creeds of the Orthodox Church.  It appeared the same year in two Latin editions, four French, one German and one English, and in the Eastern Church it started a controversy which brought critics at several synods, in 1638 at Constantinople, in 1642 at the Synod of Iași, and culminated in 1672 with the convocation by Dositheos, Patriarch of Jerusalem, of the Synod of Jerusalem, by which the Calvinistic doctrines were condemned.

Cyril was also particularly well disposed towards the Church of England, and corresponded with the Archbishops of Canterbury. It was in his time that Metrophanes Kritopoulos – later to become Patriarch of Alexandria (1636–39) – was sent to England to study.  Both Lucaris and Kritopoulos were lovers of books and manuscripts, and many of the items in the collections of books and these two Patriarchs acquired manuscripts that today adorn the Patriarchal Library.

In 1629 in Geneva the Eastern Confession of the Christian faith was published in Latin, containing the Calvinist doctrine. In 1633 it was published in Greek. The Council of Constantinople in 1638 anathematized both Cyril and the Eastern Confession of the Christian faith, but the Council of Jerusalem in 1672, specially engaged in the case of Cyril, completely acquitted him, testified that the Council of Constantinople cursed Cyril not because they thought he was the author of the confession, but for the fact that Cyril hadn't written a rebuttal to this essay attributed to him.

The correspondence of Cyril Lucaris, in which he confirmed his authorship of the "Confessio", and the comparison of the autograph of the "Confessio" with his letters left no doubt that the real author is Cyril Lucaris himself. However, until the end of the XX century, the overwhelming majority of Greek and Russian Orthodox scientists (Ivan Malyshevsky, bishop Arsenius (Bryantsev), Vasily Malakhov, George Michaelides, Nikolay Talberg) denied the authenticity of the "Confessio", which resulted in the canonization of Cyril in 2009 by the Greek Orthodox Patriarchate of Alexandria.

Politics and death
Lucaris was several times temporarily deposed and banished at the instigation of both his Orthodox opponents and the Catholic French and Austrian ambassadors, while he was supported by the Protestant Dutch and English ambassadors to the Ottoman capital. Finally, when the Ottoman Sultan Murad IV was about to set out for the Persian War, the Patriarch was accused of a design to stir up the Cossacks, and to avoid trouble during his absence the Sultan had him strangled by the Janissaries on 27 June 1638 aboard a ship in the Bosporus. His body was thrown into the sea, but it was recovered and buried at a distance from the capital by his friends, and only brought back to Constantinople after many years.

Lucaris was honoured as a saint and martyr shortly after his death, and Eugenios of Aitolia compiled an akolouthia (service) to celebrate his memory.

According to a 1659 letter to Thomas Greaves from Edward Pococke (who, on his book-hunting travels for archbishop William Laud, had met Lucaris) many of the choicest manuscripts from Lucaris' library were saved by the Dutch ambassador who sent them by ship to Holland. Although the ship arrived safely, it sank the next day in a violent storm along with its cargo.

References

Citations

Sources

Further reading

External links
  – article from an Orthodox standpoint claiming Lucaris was not a Calvinist.
 .
 .
 

|-

|-

|-

|-

|-

1572 births
1638 deaths
Cyril 03 of Alexandria
Greek saints of the Eastern Orthodox Church
Greek theologians
17th-century Ecumenical Patriarchs of Constantinople
17th-century Eastern Orthodox martyrs
Eastern Orthodox Christians from Greece
Kingdom of Candia
Executed priests
People executed by strangulation
17th-century executions by the Ottoman Empire
17th-century Greek people
17th-century Greek politicians 
17th-century Greek writers
17th-century Greek educators
17th-century Greek philosophers